Saytakovo (Häytäk) is a rural locality (a village) in Uchalinsky Selsoviet, Uchalinsky District, Bashkortostan, Russia. The population was 351 as of 2010. There are 6 streets.

Geography 
Saytakovo is located 18 km east of Uchaly (the district's administrative centre) by road. Uchaly is the nearest rural locality.

References 

Rural localities in Uchalinsky District